The given name Durand may refer to:

 Durand de Bredons (died 1071), French Benedictine and bishop of Toulouse
 Durand of Gloucester (fl.1086), Sheriff of Gloucestershire in 1086
 Durand of Huesca (died 1224), Catholic theologian
 Durand or Durandus of Saint-Pourçain (1275–1332), French philosopher and theologian
 Durand Rudy Macklin (born 1958), American retired basketball player
 Durand Scott (born 1990), American basketball player
 Durand Soraine (born 1983), Indian-born Canadian cricket player
 Durand Durand, a character in Barbarella
 Durand Echeverria (1913–2001), American historian
 Durand W. Springer (1866–1943), American football coach and accountant

See also 
 Durand (disambiguation)